The 2005 Texas A&M Aggies football team completed the season with a 5–6 record.  The Aggies had a regular season Big 12 record of 3–5.

Season
Despite being ranked #17 in preseason polls, the 2005 Aggie defense ranked 107th nationally (out of 119 NCAA Division I-A teams) and allowed 443.8 yards per game. This prompted head coach Dennis Franchione to dismiss defensive coordinator Carl Torbush. Franchione then hired former Western Michigan head coach Gary Darnell to replace Torbush.

Schedule

Game summaries

Clemson

Southern Methodist

Texas State

This game was originally scheduled for Saturday, September 24, but was moved up to Thursday, September 22, due to the threat of Hurricane Rita. Out of town fans were encouraged to not travel to the game so actual attendance was about half of the reported 72,741.  The Texas A&M campus was already hosting evacuees from Hurricane Katrina and many more people from the Texas Gulf Coast were coming to or through College Station before Hurricane Rita made landfall.

Baylor

Colorado

Oklahoma State

Kansas State

Iowa State

Texas Tech

Oklahoma

Texas

References

Texas AandM
Texas A&M Aggies football seasons
Texas AandM Aggies football